The 422d Bombardment Squadron is an inactive United States Air Force unit. Its last assignment was with the 305th Bombardment Wing at Bunker Hill Air Force Base, Indiana, where it was inactivated on 15 February 1961.

History

World War II

Established in June 1942 as a Boeing B-17 Flying Fortress heavy bombardment squadron; it trained under Second Air Force. The squadron deployed to the European Theater of Operations in September 1942, being assigned to VIII Bomber Command in England. It began flying long-range strategic bombardment missions on 17 November 1942 and attacked such targets as submarine pens, docks, harbors, shipyards, motor works and marshalling yards in France, Germany and the Low Countries. Starting in 1943, the squadron began flying Nickeling missions, dropping leaflets over occupied territory.  In June 1944 this mission, along with most of the squadron's personnel and aircraft, were transferred to the 858th Bombardment Squadron and the 422d returned to strategic bombing operations.

It continued attacks on enemy cities, manufacturing centers, transportation links and other targets until the German capitulation in May 1945.

After combat missions ended, the squadron moved to Sint-Truiden Airfield in Belgium in July 1945, where it conducted photo-mapping and intelligence-gathering flights over Europe and North Africa which came under the name Project Casey Jones. On 15 December 1945 it moved to Lechfeld Airfield, Germany which it had bombed on 18 March 1944 and which it now used as an occupation base.

The 422d Bombardment Squadron was inactivated in December 1946 in Germany.

Tactical bomber training

During the Korean War, Tactical Air Command trained aircrews at Langley Air Force Base, Virginia.  The three squadrons of the 4400th Combat Crew Training Group performing this mission were Air National Guard units that had been called up for the war.  At the start of 1953, these squadrons were released to state control and the 423d Squadron took over the mission, personnel, and equipment of the 115th Bombardment Squadron, which returned to the California Air National Guard. It was then equipped with obsolete North American B-45 Tornado light bombers. The squadron was inactivated in 1954.

Strategic Air Command
From 1958, the Boeing B-47 Stratojet wings of Strategic Air Command (SAC) began to assume an alert posture at their home bases, reducing the amount of time spent on alert at overseas bases.  The SAC alert cycle divided itself into four parts: planning, flying, alert and rest to meet General Thomas S. Power's initial goal of maintaining one third of SAC's planes on fifteen minute ground alert, fully fueled and ready for combat to reduce vulnerability to a Soviet missile strike. To implement this new system B-47 wings reorganized from three to four squadrons. The 422d was activated at MacDill Air Force Base, Florida as the fourth squadron of the 305th Bombardment Wing.  In June of that year, the unit moved to Bunker Hill Air Force Base, Indiana.  As the 305th Wing transitioned to the Convair B-58 Hustler, the squadron was inactivated in February 1961.

Lineage
 Constituted as the 33d Reconnaissance Squadron (Heavy) on 28 January 1942.
 Activated on 1 March 1942
 Redesignated 422d Bombardment Squadron (Heavy) on 22 April 1942
 Redesignated 422d Bombardment Squadron, Heavy on 30 August 1943
 Inactivated on 25 December 1946
 Redesignated 422d Bombardment Squadron, Light on 15 November 1952
 Activated on 1 January 1953
 Inactivated on 23 March 1954
 Redesignated 422d Bombardment Squadron, Medium on 6 October 1958
 Activated on 1 January 1959
 Discontinued and inactivated on 15 February 1961

Assignments
 305th Bombardment Group, 1 March 1942 – 25 December 1946
 4430th Air Base Wing, 1 January 1953
 Tactical Air Command, 1 May 1953 (attached to 405th Fighter-Bomber Wing)
 Third Air Force, 20 December 1953 (attached to 47th Bombardment Wing)
 47th Bombardment Group, 8 February – 23 March 1954
 305th Bombardment Wing, 1 January 1959
 3958th Operational Evaluation and Training Group, 1 October 1959
 305th Bombardment Wing, 8 March 1960 – 15 February 1961

Stations

 Salt Lake City Army Air Base, Utah, 1 March 1942
 Geiger Field, Washington, 11 June 1942
 Muroc Army Air Field, California, 4 July 1942 – 3 August 1942
 RAF Grafton Underwood (AAF-106), England, 12 September 1942
 RAF Chelveston (AAF-105), England, 11 December 1942
 Sint-Truiden Airfield (A-92) (B-62), Belgium, 25 July 1945
 AAF Station Lechfeld (R-71), Germany, 19–25 December 1946

 Langley Air Force Base, Virginia, 1 January – 11 December 1953
 RAF Sculthorpe, England, 20 December 1953 – 23 March 1954
 MacDill Air Force Base, Florida, 1 January 1959
 Bunker Hill Air Force Base, Indiana, 1 June 1959
 Carswell Air Force Base, Texas, 1 October 1959
 Bunker Hill Air Force Base, Indiana, 15 March 1960 – 15 February 1961

Aircraft
 Boeing B-17 Flying Fortress, 1942–1946
 Douglas B-26 Invader, 1953
 North American B-45 Tornado, 1953–1954
 Boeing B-47 Stratojet, 1959

References

Notes
 Explanatory notes

 Citations

Bibliography

 
 
 
 
 
 

 Further reading
 

Bombardment squadrons of the United States Air Force
Bombardment squadrons of the United States Army Air Forces
Military units and formations established in 1942
Military units and formations disestablished in 1961
1942 establishments in Utah
1961 disestablishments in Indiana